Qadah may refer to:
 Qadah-e Bala
 Qadah-e Pain